Jefferson Square, an office complex in downtown Columbia, South Carolina, is the headquarters of the state's Department of Health and Human Services which oversees the Medicaid program for South Carolinians. Located at 1801 Main St. in the city's historic Arsenal Hill neighborhood, the complex includes a 15-story,  office tower and a two-story courtyard plaza. Also on the Jefferson Square block (bordered by Laurel, Assembly, Richland, and Main) are the offices of Wilson-Kibler real estate, two parking garages, a parking lot, and the Arsenal Hill Associate Reformed Presbyterian Church.

More Photos

External links
Arsenal Hill Associate Reformed Presbyterian Church
Cavanaugh's Deli
South Carolina Department of Health and Human Services

Office buildings in South Carolina
Buildings and structures in Columbia, South Carolina